Siddharth Anand (born 31 July 1978) is an Indian film director, screenwriter and producer. He is best known for directing the action thriller films: Bang Bang! (2014), War (2019), and Pathaan (2023); which became the highest grossing film of Hindi cinema.

He has also scripted and directed romantic comedy films, including Salaam Namaste (2005), Ta Ra Rum Pum (2007), Bachna Ae Haseeno (2008), and Anjaana Anjaani (2010).

Filmography

Film

As assistant director
 Kuch Khatti Kuch Meethi (2001)
 Mujhse Dosti Karoge! (2002)
 Hum Tum (2004)

Television

References

External links 
 

21st-century Indian film directors
Hindi-language film directors
Indian male screenwriters
Living people
1983 births
Indian filmmakers